Ukrainian Republic refers to Ukraine. Articles about historical Ukraine: 

 Ukrainian People's Republic of Soviets, 1917–1918
 Ukrainian Soviet Republic, 1918
 Ukrainian People's Republic, 1917–1921
 West Ukrainian People's Republic, 1918–1919
 Ukrainian Soviet Socialist Republic, 1919–1991 (also called Ukrainian Socialist Soviet Republic)
 Ukraine, 1991–